The chadagan (чадаган) is a Tuvan bridge zither. It usually has 16 strings and is tuned to a pentatonic scale. The number of strings varies, and the bridge is sometimes movable.  Although it is usually plucked, it may also be played by striking with thin sticks, like a hammered dulcimer.

Related instruments
Related instruments are the Mongolian yatga, the Khakassian chatkhan (or jadagan), the Japanese koto, and the Chinese guzheng.

References

Tuvan musical instruments
Box zithers